Kupwara is a town and a municipal council in Kupwara district in the Indian union territory of Jammu and Kashmir.

Municipal council Kupwara is an Urban Local Body with 13 elected members (also in Delimitation in progress for wards), which administrates the city.

Demographics

 India census, Kupwara had a population of 21,771. There were 15,120 males (69%) and 6,651 females (31%). Of the population, 2,093 (9.6%) were age 0-6: 1,082 males (52%) and 1,011 females (48%).  The literacy rate for the people over six was 86.6% (males 91.9%, females 73.5%).

Religion
The dominant religion in Kupwara is Islam, followed by over 98% of the people living in Kupwara. Other religions include Hinduism, and Sikhism followed by 2%

Politics
Municipal council kupwara

Climate

Education
Some of the institutions and colleges of Kupwara town Which provide quality education to the students of town Kupwara and from the other parts of district
 Government Degree College, Kupwara
 Women's Degree College Kupwara
 Kashmir University Satellite Campus Wayen, Kupwara.
 Govt. Degree College Sogam Lolab

Notable Sports Persons

Transport

Air
Kupwara doesn't have its own airport. But the helipad are located in Zangli, Drugmulla and Kunan village at a distance of 1 & 2 kilometres from Kupwara respectively. The nearest airport is Srinagar International Airport located at a distance of 94 kilometres and is a two and a half an hour drive. There are plans to build an airport in Kupwara at Panzgam.

Rail
Kupwara doesn't have railway connectivity yet. The nearest railway stations are Baramulla railway station and Sopore railway station, located 42 and 50 kilometres from Kupwara respectively. There are plans to connect Kupwara by rail by extending the Jammu–Baramulla Rail Line up to Kupwara.

Road
Kupwara is well-connected by road to other towns and villages in J&K and India by the Sopore-Kupwara Road, Kupwara-Trehgam Road, etc. The NH 701 passes through Kupwara.

See also 
 Sportspeople_from_Jammu_and_Kashmir
 Lolab Valley
 Kupwara district
 Sports in Jammu and Kashmir
 Sogam Lolab
 Diver Anderbugh

References

Cities and towns in Kupwara district
Kupwara district